Kelly Sullivan may refer to:
 Kelly Sullivan (actress), an American actress
 Kelly Sullivan (painter), an American painter
 Kelly Sullivan (politician), an American politician

See also
Kelly v Sulivan, a Supreme Court of Canada case